Lluís-Anton Baulenas (born in Barcelona in 1958) is a Catalan novelist, translator and playwright.

Career
Among his works are the novels Rampoines 451 (1990), Noms à la sorra (1995), which was a finalist for the Sant Jordi Prize, Alfons XIV (1997), also a finalist for the Sant Jordi Prize, El fil de plata (1998), which was awarded the Serra d'Or Critics' Prize, and La felicitat (2001), which received the Prudenci Bertrana Prize.

Awards
In 2005 Baulenas won the most prestigious award in Catalan letters, the Ramon Llull Novel Award, for his book Per un sac d'ossos, about the Spanish Civil War. The Toronto Star, reviewing the English translation on 13 July 2008, commented that "Baulenas is an accomplished storyteller whose narrative never falters, never veers off-course, never relinquishes its hold on the reader".

References

External links
Escriptors.cat

Writers from Catalonia
Living people
Translators from Catalonia
English–Catalan translators
1958 births
Catalan-language writers